Sweet November may refer to:

Sweet November (1968 film), a romantic comedy-drama film starring Sandy Dennis and Anthony Newley
Sweet November (2001 film), a remake featuring Keanu Reeves and Charlize Theron
"Sweet November" (song), which reached the top of the US R&B chart in November 1992